Beichen Delta station is a subway station in Kaifu District, Changsha, Hunan, China, operated by the Changsha subway operator Changsha Metro. It entered revenue service on June 28, 2016.

History 
The station opened on 28 June 2016.

Layout

Surrounding area
 Entrance No. 2: Changsha Museum, Changsha Library, Changsha Concert Hall, Changsha Planning Exhibition Hall
 Entrance No. 3: Wujialing

References

Railway stations in Hunan
Railway stations in China opened in 2016